Ludwig Angerer (born 1 July 1891, date of death unknown) was a German painter. His work was part of the art competitions at the 1932 Summer Olympics and the 1936 Summer Olympics.

References

1891 births
Year of death missing
20th-century German painters
20th-century German male artists
German male painters
Olympic competitors in art competitions
People from Wels-Land District
Austro-Hungarian emigrants to Germany